Deh Dashti (also Romanized as Deh Dashtī) is a village in Qaleh Biyaban Rural District, in the Central District of Darab County, Fars Province, Iran. At the 2006 census, its population was 32, in 10 families.

References 

Populated places in Darab County